The Great Mosque of Taza (Berber: ⵎⵙⵀⵉⵜⴰ ⴰⵎⵇⵔⴰⵏ) is the most important religious building in the historic medina of Taza, Morocco. Founded in the 12th century, it is the oldest surviving example of Almohad architecture, although it was expanded by the Marinids in the late 13th century.

History
The Great Mosque of Taza was built on the orders of the Almohad sultan Abd al-Mu'min in the period after 1142 CE, around the same time that he conquered the city. Taza, which was the first major city the Almohads conquered outside their initial mountain domains and held a strategic location on the main road between Morocco and Algeria, serving as one of the earliest Almohad bases after Tinmel. Their future capital of Marrakesh was only conquered 1147. Accordingly, the Great Mosque of Taza is the oldest surviving monument of Almohad architecture. According to the Kitab al-Istiqsa, the walls were completed in 1172.

This original mosque was wider than it was deep, consisting of either 7 or 9 "naves" between rows of arches (running perpendicular to the southeastern qibla wall) and 4 "aisles" of arches (running parallel to the qibla wall). The last aisle, directly in front of the qibla wall, was distinguished by being slightly wider, as was the middle nave that led to the mihrab, thus forming a "T" in the plan of the mosque which was a recurring feature in other medieval Moroccan mosques in this period and afterwards. In fact, its original layout is highly similar to the layout of the Tinmal Mosque built by the Almohads soon afterwards. Its nearly square floor plan measured about 32 by 33 metres.

The mosque was enlarged during the reign of the Marinid dynasty. Construction started in 1292 and ended in October the next year, during the reign of Abu Yaqub Yusuf. (The year 1294 is also cited by Jonathan Bloom.) This expansion added two more side naves (one on the western edge and another on the eastern edge), making the mosque wider, and 4 more aisles to the south, making the prayer hall deeper, while still replicating the "T" plan by making the last southern aisle larger. Abu al-Hassan, who built many madrasas across Morocco, also built a madrasa near the mosque here in Taza in 1324 (while he was still a governor during his father's reign), though today it is mostly ruined.  Unusually, the Marinids also added a huge second courtyard (el-sahn el-kebir), almost as large as the entire mosque itself, on the mosque's east flank. The Marinid sultan Abu al-Rabi' was buried in this courtyard upon his death in 1310. 

The mosque was only the subject of patronage again after 1665 when the Alaouite leader Moulay Rashid briefly made Taza his main base and built the Dar al-Makhzen (royal palace) in the south side of the old city. Moulay Rashid restored the mosque and added a southern gallery to the grand courtyard to serve as a "summer" mosque.

Architecture

Overview 
The mosque the oldest remaining example of Almohad architecture. It is located near Bab er-Rih ("Gate of the winds"). The present-day mosque, which includes Marinid-era expansions, is composed of a main building and of a "grand courtyard" (el-sahn el-kebir) on its east side. Each of these parts have rectangular floor plans measuring around 72 by 44 meters. The mosque has nine exterior gates.

Interior (prayer hall) 
The main building consists mostly of an interior prayer hall as well as a smaller courtyard (sahn) to the north which is enclosed by extensions of the prayer hall. The prayer hall is built in a hypostyle format and is divided into 9 "naves" by rows of horseshoe arches running perpendicular to the southeastern qibla wall. The arches, in turn, form 8 transverse aisles (running parallel to the qibla wall) south of the courtyard, or 14 aisles if counting the arches that run through the galleries on either side of the courtyard all the way to the northwestern wall. The middle nave and the southernmost aisle are both wider than the others, forming a "T" shape in the layout of the mosque. This "T" plan is also highlighted by a series of decorative cupolas. The northern end of the central nave (at the entrance from the courtyard) is covered by a dome. In the fourth aisle of the mosque, about midway in the central nave, is a series of three vaulted cupolas which mark the spot where the former mihrab (wall niche symbolizing the qibla) of the mosque stood after its initial Almohad construction. This area is also marked by ornate "lambrequin" arches instead of the usual horseshoe arches as well as by some decorative engaged columns which likely once belonged to the mihrab decoration. At its southern end the central nave leads finally to the mihrab, dating from the Marinid expansion. The mihrab, as in other Moroccan mosques, is the most richly decorated part of the mosque, with its surfaces covered in carved stucco ornamentation. The space in front of the mihrab is surrounded by lambrequin arches and is covered by an especially ornate dome that is similar to other examples in the Great Mosque of Tlemcen and the Great Mosque of Fes el-Jdid and is considered to be one of the finest of its kind. The dome is carved in stucco and is pierced to allow some external light to filter in, while its corners have four muqarnas-carved squinches. At both ends of the same aisle, at the southeastern and southwestern corners of the mosque, are two other vaulted cupolas. Behind the qibla wall, on the south side of the mosque, are several chambers and smaller annexes including the imam's chamber, the minbar's storage chamber, a library, and a mida'a or ablutions chamber.

Courtyard (sahn) and minaret 
The mosque's original courtyard (sahn) is in the middle of the northern part of the building. It is flanked on its east and west sides by arcaded galleries where the two outer western and the two outer eastern naves extend as far as the northern edge of the courtyard. On the courtyard's north side are several other chambers of varying sizes which roughly correspond to the last two transversal aisles of the mosque building. Near the courtyard's northeastern corner is the tall minaret, dating from the Almohad construction and thus the oldest surviving Almohad minaret. It has a square base and its height is five times greater than its width, which corresponds to the same proportions used in the more famous Almohad minarets like that of the Kutubiyya Mosque, although the secondary shaft in this minaret is slightly squatter than in the later examples. The minaret was decorated with blind arch motifs around its windows (which once provided light to the stairway inside), though much of this decoration is no longer evident today due to the later whitewashing of its surface.

Grand courtyard (el-sahn el-kebir) 
The mosque's "grand courtyard" (el-sahn el-kebir) is a feature unique to this mosque and not found in any other historic mosque in Morocco. Located on the mosque's east side, it consists of a vast open courtyard which is almost as large as the main mosque building itself. It is planted with olive trees and has a fountain in its centre sheltered by a small domed kiosk (qubba). Along its western side is a narrow arcaded gallery that grants access between the courtyard and the mosque, while along its southern side is a deeper roofed gallery bordered by an arcade of pointed horseshoe arches. Behind this arcade, in the middle of the southern wall, is a mihrab, attesting to the area's use as an outdoor or "summer" mosque. The courtyard existed during the Marinid period, but the qubba fountain and the southern prayer gallery probably date from the time of Moulay Rashid (17th century) or later.

Furnishings

Marinid chandelier 

The mosque is also well-known for its enormous bronze chandelier, which dates from the Marinid era. According to the inscription carved on it, it was gifted to the mosque by Sultan Abu Yaqub Yusuf in 1294. With a maximum diameter of 2.5 meters and weighing 3 tons, it is the largest surviving example of its kind in North Africa. According to the Rawd al-Qirtas it cost 8000 dinars to make. It is composed of nine circular tiers arranged in an overall conical shape that could hold 514 glass oil lamps. Its decoration included mainly arabesque forms like floral patterns as well as a poetic inscription in cursive Arabic. This ornamentation was focused especially on the pole or shaft at the top of the cone and, especially, on the large dome-like underside which resembled the elaborate stucco dome in front of the mihrab. The decorative forms on this bronze chandelier were thus related, if not deliberately coordinated, with the decoration in other elements of the mosque during its Marinid expansion. Various other medieval lamps are also preserved in the mosque.

Minbar 
The mosque's minbar (pulpit) is also dated to the end of the 13th century, during the Marinid expansion under Abu Yaqub Yusuf. Like other minbars, it takes the shape of a mobile staircase with an archway at the bottom of the stairs and a canopy at the top and it is composed of many pieces of wood assembled together. It is 3.25 meters high by 2.96 metres long, and 80 cm wide. It has been partly spoiled by later restorations which disfigured some of its original aspect, especially its upper elements and the archway at the base of the staircase. Nonetheless, it still preserves much of its original Marinid woodwork and demonstrates a close relation with other richly-crafted wooden minbars in Morocco following the tradition established by the 12th-century Almoravid minbar of the Kutubiyya Mosque. The most significant preserved elements are its two flanks, which are covered with an example of the elaborate geometric decoration found in this artisan tradition. This geometric motif is based on eight-pointed stars from which interlacing bands spread outward and repeat the motif across the whole surface. Contrary to the famous Almoravid minbar in Marrakesh, however, the empty spaces between the bands are not occupied by a mix of pieces with carved floral reliefs but are rather occupied entirely by pieces of marquetry mosaic decoration inlaid with ivory and precious woods.

Anaza 
The mosque also features an historic anaza: a carved wooden screen at the entrance from the courtyard to the central nave of the prayer hall, which often acted as an "outdoor" mihrab for those performing their prayers in the courtyard. Although it is not unlikely that the mosque possessed such a features since its Marinid expansion (as other Marinid mosques have the same feature), no visible evidence indicates the date at which the current anaza was crafted. Based on the style of the craftsmanship, it has been suggested that it is and no older than the 17th century. Its courtyard-facing side is relatively plain and undecorated, but its interior-facing side is carved with various panels, including six blind arch motifs in its central section. A semi-circular tympanum above the middle is carved with a polygonal geometric pattern at the center of which is an Arabic inscription.

See also
 Moroccan architecture
Medina of Taza
List of mosques in Morocco
 History of medieval Arabic and Western European domes

References

Further reading 
 Terrasse, Henri (1943). La grande mosquée de Taza. Paris: Les Éditions d'art et d'histoire.

External links 

 https://www.ville-taza.com/laville.html (City information website; page contains a gallery with more images of the mosque)

Religious buildings and structures completed in 1172
Mosques in Morocco
12th-century mosques
Almohad architecture
Marinid architecture
Buildings and structures in Fès-Meknès
Taza